Mike or Michael Wolfe may refer to:

 Mike Wolfe (personality) (born 1964), creator and star of the TV show American Pickers
 Mike Wolfe (politician), former mayor of Stoke-on-Trent, England
 Michael Wolfe (born 1945), poet and writer
 Michael Wolfe (filmmaker) (born 1976), American actor, writer, producer and director
 Michael Wolfe (politician) (born 1982), city councillor for Richmond, BC, Canada

See also 
 Michael Wolf (disambiguation)
 Michael Wolff (disambiguation)